Dr. Hasan Hüseyin Can (born 1960) is a Turkish civil servant. Currently, he serves as the District Governor of Körfez, Kocaeli in Turkey. He was born in Kayseri in 1960. He completed his primary, secondary and high school education in Kayseri. Can graduated from Faculty of Political Science and Public Administration in Ankara University. In 1996, he completed his PhD at the İnönü University.

Career
He began his civil servant career as a district governor candidate in Tekirdağ. He was sent to the United Kingdom for further studies and foreign language for one year in 1989. Upon returning home, he served as district governor in Akçadağ, Malatya, Tut, Adiyaman, Uluborlu, Isparta, Haymana, Ankara.

In 2000, Can was department head at the General Directorate of Local Administration at the Ministry of the Interior. He served as deputy general manager at the directorate of the local administration in the Ministry of the Interior between 2002 and 2009. In 2009 Can was appointed legal advisor at the Ministry of the Interior between 2009-2014.
Hasan Hüseyin Can was appointed district governor of Körfez, Kocaeli in 2014.

Family life
Can is married and is the father of one.

References

1960 births
Turkish civil servants
Governors (Turkey)
Living people